Indumathi Kathiresan (born 5 June 1994) is an Indian women's international footballer who plays as a midfielder for Lords FA and the India women's national football team.

International
Indumathi has represented the India women's national football team since 2014. She scored 6 goals in 2014 SAFF Women's Championship. Then she became regular choice of national team. She was also selected in the squad for the 2016 SAFF Women's Championship. Where she scored 2 goals for team. Then she scored 4 goals and become top scorer of 2019 SAFF Women's Championship.

Career statistics

International goals

Honours
India
SAFF Women's Championship: 2014, 2016, 2019

Sethu
Indian Women's League: 2018–19

Lords FA
Kerala Women's League: 2022–23

Tamil Nadu
 Senior Women's National Football Championship: 2017–18

References

External links 
 Indumathi Kathiresan at All India Football Federation
 

1994 births
Footballers from Tamil Nadu
India women's international footballers
Indian women's footballers
Living people
People from Cuddalore district
Sethu FC players
Sportswomen from Tamil Nadu
Women's association football midfielders
Indian Women's League players